Juana Belén Gutiérrez de Mendoza (27 January 187513 July 1942) was a Mexican anarchist and feminist activist, typographer, journalist and poet.

Biography
She was born to a poor family in the town of San Juan del Río, Durango, on 27 January 1875. While many women contributed to the Mexican Revolution 1910-1920 by fighting alongside their husbands, others wrote against the injustices of the Díaz regime. In May 1901, she founded an anti-Díaz newspaper called Vésper. She attacked the clergy in Guanajuato and wrote against foreign domination in Mexico. She also wrote against the Díaz regime and criticized Díaz for not carrying out the requests and needs of the  people. As a result, her newspaper was confiscated and she was also put in jail several times by Díaz between 1904 and 1920. She established a new newspaper called El Desmonte (1900-1919) and continued her writings. She encouraged workers and peasants to vote as she wrote “not to integrate power, but to disintegrate it, as a means of forming, not a new oligarchy but of transforming the oligarchies into truly public administrations.” She argued that the Mexican Population could not count on the leadership of political parties given that they wanted to obtain office in order to protect their own interests. To propagate liberation ideology throughout Mexico, Juana Belén Gutiérrez de Mendoza translated the works of Peter Kropotkin, Mikhail Bakunin, and Pierre Joseph Proudhon to Spanish.  Even though she was intimidated throughout her life, she continued writing and educating the public on the injustices the different governments brought upon Mexico. She is one of the many intellectuals who contributed with her writings to the Mexican Revolution.

She was also a Caxcan Indian from the state of Durango.

References

Sources
 Macias, Anna. “Women and the Mexican Revolution.”: Academy of American Franciscan History Vol. 37, No.1 (1980): 53–82.12.
 Ana Lau Jaiven, LA PARTICIPACIÓN DE LAS MUJERES EN LA REVOLUCIÓN MEXICANA: Juana Belén Gutiérrez de Mendoza (1875-1942), UAM-Xochimilco

1875 births
1942 deaths
Indigenous Mexicans
Mexican feminists
Mexican feminist writers
Mexican women journalists
Mexican women poets
People of the Mexican Revolution
Mexican anarchists
Anarcha-feminists
Writers from Durango
Mexican translators
Translators to Spanish
Indigenous Mexican women